John Tod (1779March 27, 1830) was an American judge and politician who served as a Democratic-Republican member of the U.S. House of Representatives for Pennsylvania's 8th congressional district from 1821 to 1823 and for Pennsylvania's 13th congressional district from 1823 to 1824.  He served as a member of the Pennsylvania State Senate for the 14th district from 1815 to 1818 including as Speaker from 1815 to 1816 and as a member of the Pennsylvania House of Representatives from 1810 to 1813 including two terms as Speaker.

He served as presiding judge of the Pennsylvania Courts of Common Pleas for the 16th district from 1824 to 1827 and as an associate judge of the Pennsylvania Supreme Court from 1827 until his death in 1830.

Early years and education
In 1779, Tod was born in Suffield, Connecticut and was educated in the common schools and at Yale College.  He studied law under his brother George and received his legal certificate around 1799.  He moved with his father to Aquasco, Maryland and began teaching as Assistant Master of Charlotte Hall.  In 1802, he moved to Bedford, Pennsylvania, was admitted to the bar in 1803 and commenced the practice of law.  In 1805, he worked as postmaster of Bedford and served as a clerk to the county commissioners of Bedford County, Pennsylvania in 1806 and 1807.

Career
Tod was a member of the Pennsylvania House of Representatives from 1810 to 1813, serving twice as its Speaker.  He served as a member of the Pennsylvania State Senate for the 14th district from 1815 to 1818 including as Speaker from 1815 to 1816.

In 1820–1821, he was elected to the Seventeenth and then later into the Eighteenth Congress and served until his resignation from Congress in 1824.  He served as chairman of the United States House Committee on Manufactures during the Seventeenth and Eighteenth Congresses.

In March–April 1824, Tod was honored with a single vote at the Democratic-Republican Party Caucus to be the party's candidate for U.S. Vice President at the election later that year.

Tod served as presiding judge of the Pennsylvania Court of Common pleas for the sixteenth judicial district from 1824 from 1827 and as associate judge of the Pennsylvania Supreme Court from 1827 until his death in 1830.

Tod died on March 27, 1830 at about the age of 50 in Bedford, Pennsylvania and is interred in Bedford Cemetery.

Personal life
In 1810, he married Mary Read Hanna, the daughter of U.S. Representative John A. Hanna, and together they had five children.

See also

 Speaker of the Pennsylvania House of Representatives

Footnotes

Sources

The Political Graveyard

|-

|-

1779 births
1830 deaths
19th-century American judges
19th-century American lawyers
19th-century American politicians
Pennsylvania postmasters
Burials in Pennsylvania
County clerks in Pennsylvania
Democratic-Republican Party members of the United States House of Representatives from Pennsylvania
Judges of the Pennsylvania Courts of Common Pleas
Members of the Pennsylvania House of Representatives
Pennsylvania lawyers
Pennsylvania state senators
People from Bedford, Pennsylvania
People from Suffield, Connecticut
Justices of the Supreme Court of Pennsylvania
Speakers of the Pennsylvania House of Representatives
Yale College alumni

Politicians from Bedford County, Pennsylvania